The seventy-fifth Minnesota Legislature first convened on January 6, 1987. The 67 members of the Minnesota Senate and the 134 members of the Minnesota House of Representatives were elected during the General Election of November 4, 1986.

Sessions 
The legislature met in a regular session from January 6, 1987, to May 18, 1987. A special session was convened on June 25, 1987, to enact legislation strengthening the state's laws regarding corporate takeovers.

A continuation of the regular session was held between February 9, 1988, and April 25, 1988.

Party summary 
Resignations and new members are discussed in the "Membership changes" section, below.

Senate

House of Representatives

Leadership

Senate 
President of the Senate
Jerome M. Hughes (DFL-Maplewood)

President pro tempore
Florian Chmielewski (DFL-Sturgeon Lake)

Senate Majority Leader
Roger Moe (DFL-Erskine)

Senate Minority Leader
Duane Benson (IR-Lanesboro)

House of Representatives 
Speaker of the House
Until June 25, 1987 Fred C. Norton (DFL-St. Paul)
After June 25, 1987 Robert Vanasek (DFL-New Prague)

House Majority Leader
Until June 25, 1987 Robert Vanasek (DFL-New Prague)
After June 25, 1987 Ann Wynia (DFL-St. Paul)

House Minority Leader
William R. Schreiber (IR-Brooklyn Park)

Members

Senate

House of Representatives

Membership changes

Senate

House of Representatives

Notes

References 

 Minnesota Legislators Past & Present - Session Search Results (Session 75, Senate)
 Minnesota Legislators Past & Present - Session Search Results (Session 75, House)

75th
1980s in Minnesota
1987 in Minnesota
1988 in Minnesota
1987 U.S. legislative sessions
1988 U.S. legislative sessions